The Fourth Year of War is a 1983 Soviet war film directed by Georgy Nikolaenko.

Plot 
The film takes place in 1944. The Soviet command is preparing an offensive. A group of scouts led by Nadezhda Moroz will go to the area of the forest, which is under the protection of the Germans.

Cast 
 Lyudmila Savelyeva as Nadezhda Moroz
 Nikolay Olyalin as Nikolay Pavlov
 Aleksandr Zbruev as Aleksandr Spirin
 Nikolay Eryomenko as Antipov
 Aleksandr Denisov as Zhurba
 Timofey Spivak as Arthur
 Vyacheslav Baranov as Ptakhin
 Lev Durov as Saveliy Khomutov
 Vladimir Smirnov as Burenkov
 Aleksandr Lebedev as Egor Krasilnikov

References

External links 
 

1983 films
1980s Russian-language films
Soviet war films
Soviet World War II films
Russian World War II films
1980s war films